Birch Creek is a  northeastward-flowing stream originating on the western slope of the Bear River Range in Franklin County, Idaho, United States. In turn, Mink Creek flows southwest to its confluence with the Bear River and, from there, its flows terminate in the Great Salt Lake.

Ecology
Birch Creek hosts Bonneville cutthroat trout (Oncorhynchus clarkii utah), a subspecies of cutthroat trout native to tributaries of the Great Salt Lake, and one of 14 or so recognized subspecies of cutthroat trout native to the western United States. In addition to increased drought, Bonneville cutthroat are threatened by introduced non-native trout species  through predation, competition, and hybridization. The instream and riparian degradation of Birch Creek is associated with decades of heavy cattle grazing pressure, removal of beaver (Castor canadensis), and encroachment of pinyon and juniper forests. Channel incision has lowered the water table and reduced floodplain connectivity, which has further adversely affected the condition of the riparian areas which is critical habitat for a variety of aquatic and riparian obligate species particularly greater sage-grouse (Centrocercus urophasianus). A project to restore beaver to the creek led by Idaho rancher Jay Wilde and Utah State University watershed scientist, that began with reduced riparian grazing pressure, construction of beaver dam analogues, and then followed by translocation of beaver to the stream has increased cutthroat trout abundance ten-fold.

See also
Bear River Range
Bear River

References

External links
 Idaho Rancher Jay Wilde restores beaver to Birch Creek Educational Video (12 minutes)

Bear River (Great Salt Lake)
Tributaries of the Great Salt Lake